Sheikh Mujibur Rahman is a Bangladesh Awami League politician and a former Member of Parliament of Satkhira-1.

Career
Rahman was elected to parliament from Satkhira-1 as a Bangladesh Awami League candidate in 2008.

References

Awami League politicians
Living people
9th Jatiya Sangsad members
1943 births